The Rebellion of Arbanon in 1257–1259 was a revolt of the Principality of Arbanon (in modern central Albania) against the Empire of Nicaea and in favour of the rival Despotate of Epirus.

Arbanon had long been an autonomous principality within Epirus, and the Nicaean conquest around 1255 was resented. The rebellion was a reaction to the imposition of Nicaean rule in the person of governor Constantine Chabaron. The rebels were active in Durrës, Ohrid, Debar and Mat. The Nicaean forces were under the command of George Akropolites, who described the events himself in his history. 

In the autumn of 1257, Akropolites left Thessaloniki and by way of Kastoria entered Kounavia, Mat and Debar in an effort to convince the local chieftains to abandon the Despot of Epirus, Michael II, and submit to imperial rule. Yet, in February 1258 the Nicaean garrisons were annihilated. Taking advantage of the situation, Michael II started his campaign against the Nicaeans and captured Chabaron in Kanina. The Albanians drove back the imperial troops sent as reinforcements and Akropolites set fresh troops in the move, opening his way to Ohrid and Prespa, but without having a chance to engage the rebels in the inner regions. He was forced to return to Prilep and fell captive to Michael II. The revolt was suppressed after troops from Asia Minor were sent in the spring of 1259, headed by John Komnenos. The most decisive battle was fought in the city of Devol. After suffering heavy losses, the Byzantines were finally able to control the situation, but in the years 1260–1270 the Albanian rulers revolted again in the region of Durrës.

References 

1250s in the Byzantine Empire
1250s conflicts
1250s in Europe
1257 in Europe 
1258 in Europe
1259 in Europe
13th-century rebellions
Medieval rebellions in Europe
Albania under the Byzantine Empire
Arbanon